Argyrotaenia tenuis is a species of moth of the family Tortricidae. It is found in Ecuador in the provinces of Carchi and Cotopaxi.

The wingspan is 16.5-17.5 mm. The ground colour of the forewings is yellowish brown, in the distal third of the wing more cream grey. The markings are yellowish brown, and the suffusions are brownish gray. The hindwings are grayish-brown in color.

Etymology
The species name refers to the shape of the uncus and is derived from Latin tenuis (meaning slender, delicate).

References

Moths described in 2008
tenuis
Moths of South America